Zaoshi Town is an urban town in Chaling County, Hunan Province, People's Republic of China.

Cityscape
The town is divided into 18 villages and 1 community, the following areas: Zaoshi Community, Guantang Village, Dongling Village, Xiling Village, Yankou Village, Zaoyuan Village, Dongtou Village, Lingguan Village, Jingyuan Village, Wuxing Village, Chebei Village, Sashui Village, Tianjia Village, Houquan Village, Dachong Village, Huxing Village, Duijiang Village, Caobai Village, and Haitan Village.

References

External links

Divisions of Chaling County